Rising Above Bedlam is an album by Jah Wobble's Invaders of the Heart, released by Oval Records in 1991.

The album was a shortlisted nominee for the 1992 Mercury Prize.

Critical reception
Trouser Press called the album "ambitious" and "a refreshing departure from some of the flat, occasionally tedious and self-conscious material [Wobble] lobbed out in the '80s." The Rough Guide To Rock praised "Visions of You" and "Bomba," writing that they made the album "worthwhile."

Track listing

Personnel
Jah Wobble - bass, vocals, keyboards, drum programming, timbales 
Justin Adams - electric guitar, Spanish guitar, Arabic percussion, saz, vocals
Mark Ferda - keyboards, drum programming, sampler, effects
Natacha Atlas - vocals
Sinéad O'Connor - vocals

References

Jah Wobble albums
1992 albums